Caelia Macrina was a Roman woman who lived in Tarracina around 150 AD.

In 150 AD, Caelia Macrina left money for the construction of a building in Tarracina, Italy and at the same time endowed an alimentary fund (to provide cash grants for food) for 200 children. Alimentary grants could either be private or governmental, and were customarily larger for boys than for girls. The shorter period allowed for girls to receive support reflects their younger age at marriage (often 13 or 14 years). Caelia followed this pattern but was more generous to girls than was usual. 

An inscription remains on the building which Caelia Macrina endowed:

From among the roughly twelve hundred inscriptions that attest to civic patrons within the Roman Empire, eighteen indicate that women received the honorary title of ‘patron of the community’ (patrona civitatis).

References

2nd-century Roman women
Caelii